The Coromandel Express is one of the flagship trains of the Indian Railways, which runs down the east coast of India between Shalimar Station (SHM) in Howrah, West Bengal and MGR Chennai Central Station (MAS) in Chennai, Tamil Nadu on daily basis. It used to run between Howrah (HWH) and Chennai Central but in January 2022, its terminal was changed to Shalimar instead of Howrah. It is one of the first earliest Superfast trains in the of Indian Railways. Most people travelling to Chennai prefer this train as it arrives earlier than Chennai Mail. The train runs jam-packed throughout the year.

History
The land of the Chola dynasty was called Cholamandalam in Tamil, literally translated as "the realm of the Cholas", from which Coromandel is derived. The Coromandel Coast is the name given to the southeastern coast of the Indian peninsula. The Eastern Coast of India along the Bay of Bengal is called the Coromandel Coast and hence the name was given to this train, as it traverses the entire length of the Coromandel coast. This train belongs to the South Eastern Railway zone, which was earlier known as Bengal Nagpur Railways (BNR).

Route
The route uses the Howrah–Chennai main line along the East Coast of India. The train is particularly famous for non-stop run between Vijayawada and Chennai, and it runs up to Visakhapatnam with two stops at Eluru and Rajahmundry. The other stops are Brahmapur, Khurda Road, Bhubaneswar, Cuttack, Bhadrak, Balasore and Kharagpur. Hence, it has five stops in Andhra Pradesh, seven in Odisha, two in West Bengal.

When it was introduced in 1977, it was a bi-weekly train and it had stops only at Vijayawada, Visakhapatnam and Bhubaneswar and it used to bypass Cuttack and Khurda Road & Ongole were technical halts. It used to cover the journey that time in only 23 hrs 30 mins time. Timings that time were: Howrah 17.15 hrs dep, Madras 16.45 hrs arrival next day. In return Madras 09.00 hrs dep, Howrah 08.30 hrs arr next day. Later many stops were introduced like Kharagpur, Balasore, Bhadrak, Khurda Road, Brahmapur, etc. which slowed down this train by up to 3 hours. It had a distinct livery when it was introduced in 1977. On an experimental basis additional stops at Tadepalligudem (TDD), Andhra Pradesh is introduced since 2015. Technical halt at Ongole is still present for pantry purpose.

Timings 

 The 12841 UP train starts from Shalimar at 15.20 HRS and reaches Chennai Central the next day around 16.50 HRS
 The 12842 DN train starts from Chennai Central around 7 AM and reaches Shalimar the next day at 10.40 AM.

Loco links
This train is currently hauled by CLW-manufactured WAP-7 class electric locomotives maintained by Electric Loco Shed Santragachi of South Eastern Railway from Howrah Junction to Visakhapatnam and Lallaguda or Royapuram-based WAP-7 class electric locomotives to Chennai Central . These 5000 hp & 6350 hp locomotives are fit to run at 140 km/h but due to limitation of sectional speed, Coromandel Express runs at a maximum permissible speed of 130 km/h. Immediately after electrification, this train was hauled by Lallaguda-based WAP-4 loco from Chennai to Howrah but due to difficulty and excessive time required to reverse loco at Visakhapatnam, subsequently it was decided to run it by Santragachi-based Loco from Howrah to Visakhapatnam and from Visakhapatnam to Chennai by Erode-based WAP-4. When Royapuram shed came up near Chennai, Royapuram based loco is utilized to haul it from Visakhapatnam to Chennai.

Prior to completion of electrification of east coast line, there was no alternative but to run this train by a single diesel WDM-4 (from Kharagpur Diesel Loco Shed) and later on double diesel locomotives because of adding more coaches. After electrification, single WAP-4 or WAP-7 electric locomotive is adequate. Thus there was straightway saving of one locomotive for Indian Railway.

In February 2009, the train derailed near Jajpur Keonjhar Road in which apart from other damages and casualties the Santragachi-based WAP-4 22330 locomotive got damaged beyond economic repair and therefore had to be condemned.

Since 2018 WAP-7, locomotive pulls the train from Visakhapatnam to Chennai and Chennai to Visakhapatnam. From Shalimar to Visakhapatnam and Visakhapatnam to Shalimar, Santragachi-based WAP-7 locomotive pulls the train.

Speed
This train traverses the total distance of 1659 kms in a total time of 25 hrs 30 mins with the maximum speed of 130 km/hr. It receives the highest priorities during its run from Shalimar to Chennai, thus for its high priorities this train is known as SER King.

Bridges
The train passes over some important rivers of India:
Creek in Ennore near Chennai
Penna river in Nellore
Paleru river in Ongole
Krishna River in Vijayawada
Godavari River in Rajahmundry
Nagavali River in Srikakulam
Vamsadhara River in Srikakulam
Rushikulya River in Ganjam
Mahanadi river in Cuttack
Kathjori river (Mahanadi distributary) in Cuttack
Kuakhai River (Mahanadi distributary) near Barang
Birupa River (Mahanadi distributary) near Kendrapara
Brahmani River in Jenapur
Baitarani River in Jajpur Keonjhar Rd.
Budhabalanga River in Balasore.
Subarnarekha River in Rupsa.
Rupnarayan River in Kolaghat near Mecheda
Damodar River near Bagnan

Gallery

Coach composition

12841/12842 Shalimar – Chennai Central – Shalimar Coromandal Superfast Express has Coach Composition which is reversed at Visakhapatnam:

Accidents and incidents 
On 15 March 2002, about seven coaches of the Howrah–Chennai Coromandel Express derailed around 2:40 pm at Padugupadu road over-bridge in Kovuru mandal in Nellore district, leaving as many as 100 passengers injured. The poor condition of the main rail track in Nellore district between Vijayawada and Chennai was suspected of being the cause of the accident.

On 13 February 2009 the train derailed near Jajpur Keonjhar Road about 100 km away from Bhubaneswar in Orissa killing at least 15 people and leaving several injured, some critically. The reason for the derailment is not known. A high level inquiry was ordered by the Railways following the incident. Hence after the accident the train when reaches Jajpur Keonjhar Road it decreases its speed until 1 km far from the station and far from the accident spot. Coromandel Express was moving at 115 km/h when the accident occurred. Though it can travel at 130 km/h.

Six elephants including two calves were killed after being hit by Coromandel Express in Odisha's Ganjam district early on 30 December 2012. A bedroll attendant on the train also died in the accident, but the circumstances of his death were unclear.

On 14 January 2012, a fire broke out in a general compartment of Chennai–Howrah Coromandel Express near Lingaraj railway station. However, the flames were extinguished before they could spread. The fire was spotted in the coach, second from the engine, when the superfast express train was proceeding towards , a spokesman of East Coast Railway (ECoR) said. No injury was caused to anyone as the fire brigade was called in immediately and the fire was controlled within 20 minutes. All those on board the superfast train are safe. Prompt steps prevented the fire from spreading. The affected compartment was detached at Bhubaneswar railway station as a precautionary measure and the train proceeded to its destination, the spokesman said. Preliminary information indicated that the fire might have erupted due to carelessness of some travellers and an inquiry has been ordered into the incident, he added.

Two of the bogies were damaged, said the report. No casualties were reported the during the incident.

References

External links 

Transport in Chennai
Rail transport in Howrah
Named passenger trains of India
Express trains in India
Rail transport in West Bengal
Rail transport in Odisha
Rail transport in Andhra Pradesh
Rail transport in Tamil Nadu
Railway services introduced in 1977